In Too Deep is the ninth studio album by Australian singer John Paul Young and first studio album in 10-years. The album was released in November 2006. The album sees John reunite with his 70s hitmaker Harry Vanda as producer and principal songwriter, with whom he worked in the 1970s and became one of the biggest Australian stars.

Track listing
 "In Too Deep" (Vanda) - 3:45
 "I'm Living On Dreams" (Vanda, Young) - 4:06
 "Isn't It Sunshine" (Vanda, Young) - 3:35
 "Not Me" (Vanda, Young) - 4:25
 "When You Love Me" (Vanda, Young) - 3:50
 "Spanish Guitar" (Vanda) - 3:30
 "I've Been Waiting" (Vanda) - 4:28
 "Prisoner Of Love" (Vanda) - 4:25
 "When I Remember You" (Vanda) - 3:20
 "Having A Few" (Anton) - 3:43
 "How Can I Live (Without Love)" (Vanda) - 4:09
 "Oh My Love" (Gamage) - 3:48

Personnel
John Paul Young - lead vocals
Harry Vanda - lead guitar, keyboards, percussion, backing vocals
Daniel Vandenberg - bass on "In Too Deep", "I've Been Waiting", "When I Remember You"
Billy Kristian - bass on "I'm Living On Dreams", "Not Me", "When You Love Me", "Spanish Guitar", "Prisoner Of Love", "Having A Few", "How Can I Live (Without Love)" "Oh My Love"
George Young - bass on "Isn't It Sunshine" 
James Morrison - saxophone on "I'm Living On Dreams", "I've Been Waiting", "When I Remember You", "How Can I Live (Without Love)" 
Warren 'Pig' Morgan - piano & keyboards
Rick Robertson - sax on "Isn't It Sunshine"
Danny Heifetz - drums
Louise Anton - backing vocals

Production
Producer: Harry Vanda
Mixed by Daniel Vandenberg
Assistant Engineer: Chris Jackson
Mastered by Greg Calbi at Sterling Sound, New York

References

2006 albums
Albums produced by Harry Vanda
John Paul Young albums